State Trunk Highway 105 (often called Highway 105, STH-105 or WIS 105) is a  east–west state highway in Douglas County, Wisconsin, that connects Oliver (at the Minnesota border at Duluth) with Tower Avenue in Superior.

WIS 105 serves as an east–west arterial route between the city of Superior, the village of Oliver, and the Gary-New Duluth neighborhood of Duluth that passes through the Town of Superior.

Route description
The western terminus of WIS 105 is at the state line with Minnesota at the Oliver Bridge. The bridge crosses the Saint Louis River to the Gary-New Duluth neighborhood in the city of Duluth. The highway follows Union Street through Oliver and 61st street into Superior. After crossing the river, WIS 105 becomes Minnesota State Highway 39 (MN 39, East McCuen Street). From its western terminus, WIS 105 runs east-west through Oliver, intersecting with County Trunk Highway W (CTH-W) in western Oliver. After exiting Oliver, it curves northeast through the town of Superior before entering the city of Superior. It then runs east-west through southern Superior before ending at an intersection with WIS 135. The highway is undivided for its entire length.

History
WIS 105 was designated along a route resembling its current one between 1923 and 1926. Sometime between 1944 and 1956, middle of the route as smoothed between Oliver and Superior.

Major intersections

See also

References

External links

105
Transportation in Douglas County, Wisconsin